David Ian Chalk (born 1959) is a Canadian technology entrepreneur,  cyber security specialist, and media personality who hosted the syndicated Dave Chalk's Computer Show, and its subsequent incarnations Dave Chalk Computer Life, Dave Chalk Connected Live, Dave Chalk Connected, and Dave Chalk Connected (In-flight).

Early life 
Chalk was born in Croydon, England in September 1959 and relocated with his family to British Columbia, Canada. He had dyslexia, face blindness, and other conditions he acquired from brain damage at birth.

Education 
Chalk completed high school, but did not finish his university degree.

Chalk was granted an Honorary Doctorate of Technology by the University of the Fraser Valley’s Alumni Association board."

In May 2021 Chalk learned to read and spell; the entirety of his instruction was captured on film.

Career highlights 

Chalk established one of the longest-running technology shows in Canada ("Dave Chalk's Computer Show").

He is the founder of more than 15 successful companies including Doppler Computer Superstores, Chalk Media, Decision-Zone Cyber Defence Technology, Trees Matter, New Century Video Streaming, and CalmWear™ Compression Clothing for Autism and most recently he helps create Mentorship programs within organizations.

References 

Canadian television hosts
Canadian radio personalities
Living people
People from Croydon
Canadian businesspeople
BlackBerry Limited people
1963 births
People with dyslexia